The Florida lance, scientific name Elliptio waltoni, is a species of freshwater mussel, an aquatic bivalve mollusk in the family Unionidae, the river mussels.

This species is endemic to the United States.

References

Fauna of the United States
Elliptio
Molluscs described in 1888
Taxonomy articles created by Polbot